Amoy Street is the name of the following streets:
Amoy Street (Hong Kong) in Wan Chai, Hong Kong Island, Hong Kong
Amoy Street, Singapore in Chinatown, Singapore

Road disambiguation pages